Emma Linnea Lundh (born 26 June 1989) is a Swedish footballer. She plays as a forward for Swedish club Bollstanäs and the former Sweden women's national football team. Before joining England's Liverpool in 2016, Lundh had played for several teams in Sweden and for Norwegian Toppserien club LSK Kvinner FK.

Club career
After beginning her football career in the boys' youth teams at IFK Viksjö, Lundh made her debut in the Damallsvenskan as a 16-year-old and moved around several clubs in quick succession. She represented Hammarby IF DFF in 2006, Djurgårdens IF Dam in 2007 and AIK in 2008. During this period Lundh was not a professional footballer and worked as a preschool teacher.
Lundh left Damallsvenskan team Linköpings FC after the 2012 season, to return to AIK of the Elitettan on a one-year contract. She had left AIK three and a half years previously, to go to Tyresö FF on loan.

In January 2016 Lundh joined Liverpool from Norwegian club LSK Kvinner FK, where she had spent the second part of the 2015 season.

Lundh left Liverpool ten months into her two-year contract, returning to Sweden with Damallsvenskan club Vittsjö GIK. She was diagnosed with multiple sclerosis in February 2017, after being hampered by fatigue for several years. She continued her football career and in August 2019 agreed to return to IF Brommapojkarna, who were embroiled in a relegation battle in the Elitettan. She was rewarded with a new contract for the 2020 season when her good form helped Brommapojkarna retain their place in the division.

International career

Lundh played in the national youth teams, and made her debut for the senior Sweden team in a 3–0 defeat by France in Amiens on 8 February 2014. She scored her first senior international goal against Northern Ireland in a 2015 Women's World Cup qualifier at Shamrock Park, Portadown in April 2014.

In May 2015 national team coach Pia Sundhage named Lundh in the squad for the 2015 FIFA Women's World Cup in Canada.

In 2016 she was awarded silver medal in 2016 olympics

References

External links

 
 
 Profile  at SvFF
 
 
 National team profile
 AIK profile
 

Living people
1989 births
Swedish women's footballers
Sweden women's international footballers
Damallsvenskan players
AIK Fotboll (women) players
Hammarby Fotboll (women) players
Djurgårdens IF Fotboll (women) players
Linköpings FC players
Tyresö FF players
2015 FIFA Women's World Cup players
People from Solna Municipality
Liverpool F.C. Women players
Women's Super League players
Expatriate women's footballers in England
Expatriate women's footballers in Norway
Toppserien players
LSK Kvinner FK players
Swedish expatriate sportspeople in England
Swedish expatriate women's footballers
Swedish expatriate sportspeople in Norway
Women's association football forwards
Vittsjö GIK players
People with multiple sclerosis
IF Brommapojkarna (women) players
Elitettan players
Sportspeople from Stockholm County
20th-century Swedish women
21st-century Swedish women